TVN7 is a Polish television channel specialising in action, drama and comedy shows and movies. Owned by TVN Group, the channel was launched in March 2002, replacing RTL7. It was relaunched on 1 September 2008 as TVN7. On 1st September 2014 the channel gained a new logo and design. It was changed again in August 2021.

TVN 7 in HD 
TVN 7 launched its HD version on 4 November 2011.

Programming 

 Papiery na szczęście
 Zakochani po uszy
 19+
 Brzydula
 Big Brother
 Hotel Paradise
 Noc magii
 Ten moment
 Reguły gry
 40 kontra 20
 Zakochaj mnie
 Dr. House

See also
List of programs broadcast by TVN 7
Television in Poland

References

External links
 Official Site 

Television channels and stations established in 2002
Television channels and stations established in 1996
Television channels in Poland
TVN (Polish TV channel)
2002 establishments in Poland